The Ambassador of the Kingdom of England to Portugal was the foremost diplomatic representative of the historic Kingdom of England in Portugal, before the creation of the Kingdom of Great Britain in 1707.

The position was not always a continuous or permanent one, and there was sometimes no diplomatic representation between the two countries.

For ambassadors of the Court of St James's to Portugal after 1707, see List of ambassadors of Great Britain to Portugal.

Envoys Extraordinary of England to Portugal
1650: Charles Vane Agent
1656: Philip Meadowes Agent
1657-1661: Thomas Maynard Agent (also Consul-General until 1689)
1661: Sir Richard Fanshaw
1661-1662: The Earl of Sandwich
1662-1665: Sir Richard Fanshaw
1666-1667: Sir Peter Wyche Special ambassador
1665-1669: Sir Robert Southwell Ambassador 
1669-1680 : Francis Parry Minister; ambassador from 1672
1680-1684: Charles Fanshawe
1685: Lord Lansdowne
1685-1688: Charles Scarborough
1691-1697: John Methuen
1694-1695 and 1696-1697: Paul Methuen, Chargé d'affaires
1697-1704: Paul Methuen Minister
1702-1706: John Methuen Ambassador
1706-1707: Sir Paul Methuen (first British ambassador to Portugal)

After the Union of England and Scotland
In 1707 the Kingdom of England became part of the new Kingdom of Great Britain. For missions from the court of St James's after 1707, see List of ambassadors of Great Britain to Portugal.

References

Portugal
England